"Komm, süßer Tod, komm selge Ruh" (Come, sweet death, come, blessed rest) is a song for solo voice and basso continuo from the 69 Sacred Songs and Arias that Johann Sebastian Bach contributed to Musicalisches Gesangbuch by Georg Christian Schemelli (BWV 478), edited by Schemelli in 1736. The text is by an anonymous author. Bach, by means of melody and harmony, expresses the desire for death and heaven. It is among his most popular works and has been adapted and transformed by several composers, such as Max Reger, Leopold Stokowski, Benjamin Britten, Knut Nystedt, and for the Wanamaker Organ, by Virgil Fox. It forms the thematic material for the final movement of the second symphony of Ernst von Dohnányi. Cliff Burton based the introduction of the song "Damage, Inc." (a series of reversed bass chords) on its chorale prelude.

References

Compositions for organ
Songs by Johann Sebastian Bach
Christian songs
Arrangements of compositions by Johann Sebastian Bach